Los Pelambres mine is a copper mine located in the north-central of Chile in Coquimbo Region. It is one of the largest copper reserves in the world, having estimated reserves of 4.9 billion tonnes of ore grading 0.65% copper.

The deposit was first recognized by Willian Burford Braden in 1920. Production in 2012 was forecast at 390 tons of copper and 28,000 ounces of gold. The mine is served by Los Pelambres Airport, and by a water desalination facility at Los Vilos. A billion-dollar expansion project is underway.

Geology
The Upper Miocene tonalite stock is a north-south oriented oval, 4.5 by 2.4 km in size, which has undergone hydrothermal alteration. The stock intruded into andesitic host rocks. Glaciation during the Pleistocene carved the U-shaped Los Pelambres valley. The head of the valley has the highest concentration of ore in a roche moutonnee. A core of potassium silicate alteration contains the economic copper-molybdenum mineralization. Sulfide minerals include chalcopyrite, bornite, pyrite and molybdenite.

See also
Antofagasta PLC
Chuquicamata
El Teniente
El Salvador mine
Potrerillos, Chile
Chanarcillo
Escondida

References 

Copper mines in Chile
Mines in Coquimbo Region
Surface mines in Chile